The 1986–87 FDGB-Pokal was the 36th edition of the East German Cup. The competition was won by 1. FC Lokomotive Leipzig, who beat Hansa Rostock 4–1 in the final. It was Leipzig's second consecutive victory in the FDGB-Pokal and fourth overall.

Qualification round

First round

Second round

Third round

Quarter-finals

Semi-finals

Final

References

External links 
DDR Football 1986/87 at rsssf.com

FDGB-Pokal seasons
1986–87 in German football cups
1986–87 in East German football